is a Japanese women's professional shogi player ranked 2-dan. She is the current representative director of the Ladies Professional Shogi-players' Association of Japan (LPSA).

Women's shogi professional

Promotion history
Nakakura's promotion history is as follows:
 2-kyū: October 1995
 1-kyū: April 1, 1996
 1-dan: April 1, 2001
 2-dan: January 21, 2009

Note: All ranks are women's professional ranks.

LPSA representative director
Nakakura was selected to replace Sachio Ishibashi as representative director of the Ladies Professional Shogi-players' Association of Japan (LPSA) in February 2014. She was re-elected as representative director in 2016,2018, 2020 and 2022.

Personal life
Nakakura's sister Akiko is a retired women's professional shogi player.

References

External links
 blog: 女流棋士中倉宏美のblog
 (Bunshun Online interview with Nakakura to discuss the 15th anniversary of the LPSA)

Japanese shogi players
Living people
Women's professional shogi players
LPSA
Professional shogi players from Tokyo Metropolis
People from Fuchū, Tokyo
1979 births